Spring & Fall is an Australian anthology television series concerning social problems like unemployment, alcoholism, and drug addiction.

There were eleven self-contained episodes, six in the first series broadcast by the ABC in 1980 and five in the second series in 1982.

Episodes 

The first episode, "Cold Comfort", received a Logie Award for Best Single Drama in 1981.

References

Australian Broadcasting Corporation original programming
Australian anthology television series
1980s Australian drama television series